Poloo is a Ghanaian snack which is referred to as fried coconut dough or fried biscuit.

Ingredients 
Ingredients used in preparation.

 Flour.
 Desiccated coconut.
 Sugar.
 Salt.
 Vegetable Oil.
 Water.

Preparation 
The process used in the preparation of Poloo.

 Pour flour into mixing bowl.
 Add the desiccated coconut.
 Add a little salt and sugar mixed together.
 Gently add water to get a hard dough.
 Roll it flat and cut into desirable shapes and sizes.
 Deep fry in vegetable oil under medium heat for about 3- 5 minutes.
 Turn until it becomes brown.
 put on strainer to remove excess oil.
 Allow to cool and serve.

External links 
How To Prepare Poloo.

References 

Ghanaian cuisine